Oliver Orav (born 31 August 1995) is an Estonian volleyball player for VK Selver Tallinn and the Estonian national team.

He participated at the 2017 Men's European Volleyball Championship.

Sporting achievements

Clubs
National cup
 2020/2021  Estonian Cup, with Selver Tallinn

References

1995 births
Living people
Estonian men's volleyball players